A by-election was held for the New South Wales Legislative Assembly electorate of Balmain on 14 January 1939 following the death of John Quirk. His widow Mary Quirk won the by-election.

Results

John Quirk died.

See also
Electoral results for the district of Balmain
List of New South Wales state by-elections

References

1939 elections in Australia
New South Wales state by-elections
1930s in New South Wales